Gansey may refer to:-

MV Gansey, an Empire F type coaster in service with C M & D M Watterson, Isle of Man, 1954–1964
Guernsey (clothing), seaman's knitted woolen sweater also called a "Gansey"
Steve Gansey, American former basketball player and head coach for the College Park Skyhawks of the NBA G League
Mike Gansey, American former professional basketball player and assistant general manager of the Cleveland Cavaliers of the National Basketball Association
Gansey, Isle of Man, a location